Haranka is a small town in the southern Middle Juba (Jubbada Dhexe) region of Somalia. It is located very close to the Indian Oceaan and the Juba river.

History
Haramka is an old settlement. It is believed to have been founded centuries ago.

Overview
The city is situated on the main road between Mogadishu and Kismayo, near Barawa and about 50 miles northeast of Jilib.

Economy
The Somali Fruit Company is based in the town.

Education
Haramka has one primary school.

Notes

References
School of Oriental and African Studies, ALC, Volumes 6–7, (University of London: 1993)

Populated places in Middle Juba